Valentina Battler , also known as Valentina Arina  and Valentina Alieva  (born November 18, 1946, Astrakhan, Russia) is a Russian-Canadian poet and artist, working in the genre of Chinese painting (Indian ink on Xuan paper).

Personal life
Battler was born in the city of Astrakhan into a Ukrainian-Russian family. Her father, Vladimir Petrovich Barannik, was a major in the militia (police). Her mother, Tatiana Nikolaevna Barannik, was a homemaker. In 1962–1966 Valentina studied at the Mussorgsky Music College of Astrakhan, where she graduated with honours. In 1966 she entered the Leningrad (currently St.-Petersburg) Rimsky-Korsakov State Conservatory – the piano department (class of Prof. N. E. Perelman) and graduated in 1971 with the qualification of soloist, ensemble player and instructor. Subsequently she worked for many years at the Gnessin Russian Academy of Music. In 1993 she emigrated to Canada where she changed her name officially to Valentina Battler and now has dual citizenship. Since 2001 she lived in Oxford (United Kingdom), and later in Paris (France). At present she resides in New York City (United States). She has been married since 1970 to Alex Battler (Oleg Arin). They have two children: son Guerman and daughter Ulyana.

Shows
2011 , New York
2007 The Russian Cultural Center, Paris, France
2006 Show Title: Symphony of Ink, Stella Art Gallery, Paris, France
2006 The Russian Cultural Center, Paris, France
2004 State Museum for Oriental Art, Moscow, Russia
2004 Ardena Foundation for educational and Cultural Programs, Moscow, Russia
2003 State Arts Museum, Shanghai, China
2003 Show Title: Rhymes and Images, Central House of Artists, Moscow, Russia
2001 International Centre of the Roerichs, Moscow, Russia
2000 Show Title: The Soul of Mine, Central House of Artist, Moscow, Russia

Books
Battler has co-authored two books with her husband, Oleg Arin:

Valentina Battler. Art of Ink Painting. Second Edition. USA: Charlestone, 2012. Book review.
 Valentina Battler (Wang Liushi). Music of Silence. (In Russian) Moscow, 2011.
 Between Titi and Caca. Impressions of a Tourist…but not only. (in Russian) Moscow: Aliyans, 2001.
Immigration to the North America. (in Russian) Moscow: Infomdinamo, 1997.

References

External links

1946 births
Living people
20th-century Russian painters
21st-century Russian painters
Russian women poets
20th-century Canadian painters
21st-century Canadian painters
21st-century Canadian poets
Canadian women poets
Russian emigrants to Canada
21st-century Canadian women writers
20th-century Canadian women artists
21st-century Canadian women artists
20th-century Russian women